Jill Anne Pryor (born March 24, 1963) is a United States circuit judge of the United States Court of Appeals for the Eleventh Circuit. Pryor was born in Harrisburg, Pennsylvania.

Education

She received her Bachelor of Arts degree in 1985 from the College of William & Mary, graduating Phi Beta Kappa and Omicron Delta Kappa. She received her Juris Doctor from Yale Law School in 1988, serving on the editorial board of the Yale Law Journal. She then clerked for Judge James Larry Edmondson of the United States Court of Appeals for the Eleventh Circuit from 1988 to 1989.

Career

Pryor joined the firm of Bondurant, Mixson & Elmore LLP as an associate in 1989, becoming a partner in 1997, a position she held before going on the bench. In private practice, she represented both plaintiffs and defendants in civil litigation in state and federal courts at both the trial and appellate level. She has served on the State Bar of Georgia Board of Governors and on the Board of Directors for the Georgia Legal Services Program. She has served as President of the Georgia Association of Women Lawyers and as Chair of the State Bar of Georgia's Appellate Practice Section. Additionally, Pryor was formerly a member of the Lawyers Advisory Committee of the United States Court of Appeals for the Eleventh Circuit as well as a member of the Executive Committee of the American Bar Association's Council of Appellate Lawyers.

Federal judicial service

On February 16, 2012, President Barack Obama nominated Pryor to be a United States Circuit Judge of the United States Court of Appeals for the Eleventh Circuit to replace Judge Stanley F. Birch, Jr., who retired in 2010. Both of Georgia's senators refused to return the "blue slips" on her nomination, effectively blocking the nomination. On January 2, 2013, her nomination was returned to the President because of the sine die adjournment of the Senate.

On January 3, 2013, she was renominated to the same judgeship. She received a hearing before the full panel of the Senate Judiciary Committee on May 13, 2014. On June 19, 2014 her nomination was reported out of committee by voice vote.

On July 30, 2014, Senate Majority Leader Harry Reid motioned to invoke cloture on Pryor's nomination. On July 31, 2014, the Senate voted 58–33 to invoke cloture on Pryor's nomination. On September 8, 2014 the Senate voted 97–0 in favor of final confirmation. She received her judicial commission on September 9, 2014. She took the oath of office on October 6, 2014.

Notable cases

In Jones et al. v. DeSantis, a 2020 voting rights case, Pryor wrote a scathing dissenting opinion. 2018 Florida Amendment 4 permitted former felons to vote, however Governor Ron DeSantis signed a law that required former felons to pay all legal fees before being eligible to vote again, despite some of them not knowing how much they owed. By a 6-4 vote, the 11th circuit upheld that law. Pryor wrote "The majority today deprives the plaintiffs and countless others like them of opportunity and equality in voting through its denial of the plaintiffs’ due process, Twenty-Fourth Amendment, and equal protection claims. I dissent."

See also
Barack Obama judicial appointment controversies

References

External links

1963 births
Living people
21st-century American judges
College of William & Mary alumni
Georgia (U.S. state) lawyers
Judges of the United States Court of Appeals for the Eleventh Circuit
United States court of appeals judges appointed by Barack Obama
Yale Law School alumni
21st-century American women judges